Pennilabium is a genus of flowering plants from the orchid family, Orchidaceae. It is native to Southeast Asia and the Himalayas.

Pennilabium acuminatum (Ridl.) Holttum - Malaysia
Pennilabium angraecoides (Schltr.) J.J.Sm. - Borneo
Pennilabium angraecum (Ridl.) J.J.Sm. - Malaysia, Java
Pennilabium armanii P.O'Byrne, Phoon & P.T.Ong - Malaysia
Pennilabium aurantiacum J.J.Sm. - Java
Pennilabium confusum (Ames) Garay - Philippines
Pennilabium kidmancoxii J.J.Wood - Sabah
Pennilabium lampongense J.J.Sm. - Sumatra
Pennilabium longicaule J.J.Sm.  - Sumatra
Pennilabium luzonense (Ames) Garay - Philippines
Pennilabium naja P.O'Byrne - Sulawesi
Pennilabium poringense (J.J.Wood & A.L.Lamb) Schuit.  - Sabah
Pennilabium proboscidcum A.S.Rao & J.Joseph - Arunachal Pradesh, Assam
Pennilabium struthio Carr - Malaysia, Thailand
Pennilabium yunnanense S.C.Chen & Y.B.Luo - Yunnan, Thailand

See also
 List of Orchidaceae genera

References

 Berg Pana, H. 2005. Handbuch der Orchideen-Namen. Dictionary of Orchid Names. Dizionario dei nomi delle orchidee. Ulmer, Stuttgart

External links

Vandeae genera
Aeridinae
Orchids of Asia